Rompin is a small town located in Jempol District, Negeri Sembilan, Malaysia, on the banks of the Muar River. Rompin developed as a town for the local community nearby. The village around Rompin town is Kampung Baru Rompin, Kampung Rompin, Kampung Balai Cina, and Kampung Tanah Panjis.

The east coastal railway line of the KTMB runs through Rompin.

Jempol District
Towns in Negeri Sembilan